Anna Turvey (born 5 February 1980) is a racing cyclist competing for Ireland. She holds the Irish National records for the 10 miles, 25 miles and 50 miles individual time trials.

Career
In 2013, while competing as an amateur triathlete, Turvey finished second in RTTC National 25-mile time trial and top 10 in The British Elite time trial. Turvey joined the Scottish Cycling Performance Program in November 2013 with a view to competing in the 2014 Commonwealth Games.  Turvey the qualified to represent Scotland at the 2014 Commonwealth Games in the Road Time Trial and the Individual Pursuit on the track, finishing 9th in the road time trial and 12th in the individual pursuit.

Turvey declared for Ireland in December 2015, qualifying through her Mother.  Turvey won the individual time trial at the Irish National Cycling Championships in June 2016. In 2016, she rode for Ireland at the 2016 European Road Championships and in the women's time trial event at the 2016 UCI Road World Championships.

Turvey answered a last minute call to ride for Ireland in the team pursuit in the 2016 UEC European Track Championships in Paris. While there she also competed in the Individual pursuit, finishing 8th  in the team pursuit, with Lydia Boylan, Lydia Gurley and Eileen Burns, and 3rd in the Individual pursuit 

Away from cycling, Turvey works as an Optometrist.  She is the cousin of British Professional Racing driver Oliver Turvey.

Major results
2019
2nd  Irish National Road Championships Elite Women Time Trial 
2nd  RTTC National 10-mile Championships 
12th UEC Road European Championships Elite Women Individual Time Trial 
34th UCI Road World Championships Elite Women Individual Time trial 
2018
3rd  RTTC National 25 Mile Road Time Trial Championships 
1st  RTTC National 10 Miles Road Time Trial Championships 
7th Chrono Champenois Trophee Europeen (1.1) (Betheny, France)(
1st  RTTC National 50 Mile Road Time Trial Championships 
9th Chrono des Nations Elite Women Individual Time trial WE (1.1) (Les Herbiers, France) 
 Beryl Burton Trophy (Champions of Champions) 
2017
19th European Road cycling Championships individual time trial (Herning, Denmark) 
3rd  RTTC National 25-mile Individual Time Trial Championships 
 17th Individual Pursuit UCI Track World Championships (Hong Kong) 
 10th Individual Pursuit UCI Track cycling World Cup IV (Los Angeles) 
2016
1st  Irish National Road Championships Elite Women Time Trial, Irish National Cycling Championships
10th Irish National Road Championships Elite Women Road Race, Irish National Cycling Championships 
  2nd  RCTT National 25 Miles Championship 
  2nd  RCTT National 10 Miles Championship 
24th European Elite Road cycling Championships (Plumelec, France)
 28th UCI Road World Championships (Doha, Qatar)
3rd  European Track Championships 2016 Elite Women 3 km Individual Pursuit 2016 UEC European Track Championships
8th European Track Championships 2016 Elite Women Team Pursuit  with Lydia Boylan, Lydia Gurley and Eileen Burns

2015
1st  RTTC National Team Time Trial Championship with Katie Archibald and Ciara Horne

2014
9th Commonwealth Games Individual Time Trial  
12th Commonwealth Games 3 km Individual Pursuit  
 1st  Individual Pursuit, Scottish National Championships Scottish National Track Championships
1st   Scottish Cycling National 25 Mile Time Trial Championships 

2013
1st  British National Duathlon Championships (Age Group)
1st  British National Sprint Distance Triathlon Championships (Age Group)
8th British Elite Road cycling Time Trial 
2nd  RTTC National 50 Miles Road Time Trial Championship  
2nd  RTTC National 25 miles Road Time Trial Championships  
4th ITU World Triathlon Final (Age Group) (London) 
2nd  Individual Pursuit, Scottish National Track Championships 
 13th Chrono des Nations Elite Women Individual Time trial 
2012
1st  British National Duathlon Championships (Age Group) 
3rd  ITU World Triathlon Final (Age Group) (Auckland) 

2011

2nd  ETU Duathlon European Championships (Limerick, Ireland) 
1st  ETU Triathlon European (sprint distance) Championships (Age Group) (Pontevedra, Spain) 
2nd  ITU World Triathlon Final Sprint Distance (Age Group) (Beijing, China)

See also
 2016 national road cycling championships

References

External links
 
 
 
 
 

1980 births
Living people
Duathletes
British female triathletes
Irish female cyclists
Scottish female cyclists
Cyclists at the 2014 Commonwealth Games
Sportspeople from Sunderland
Commonwealth Games competitors for Scotland